Weinberger is a German surname. Notable people with the surname include:

A. G. Weinberger, musician
Alan Weinberger, American businessman
Alycia J. Weinberger, Carnegie Institution staffer
Caspar Weinberger (1917–2006), American politician and Secretary of Defense under President Ronald Reagan
Daniel Weinberger (born 1947), professor
David Weinberger, technologist and commentator
Ed. Weinberger (born 1945), American screenwriter
Eliot Weinberger (born 1949), American writer, editor, and translator
Franz Weinberger, Swiss bobsledder
Hans Weinberger (1928–2017), Austrian-American mathematician
Jacob Weinberger (1882–1974), judge
Jane Weinberger (1918–2009), American author
Jaromír Weinberger (1896–1967), Czech composer
Mark Weinberger, American businessman
Marvin Weinberger (born 1989), Austrian football striker
Miro Weinberger (born 1970), American politician
Moshe Weinberger (born 1957), American rabbi
Peter J. Weinberger (born 1942), mathematician and computer scientist
Richard Weinberger (born 1990), Canadian long-distance swimmer
Sharon Weinberger, American journalist
Shmuel Weinberger (born 1963), mathematician

See also
Weinberger Doctrine
Jacob Weinberger United States Courthouse
Weinberg (disambiguation)
Vainberg

German-language surnames
Jewish surnames
Yiddish-language surnames